Shannon Brown may refer to:

Shannon Brown (born 1985), American former basketball player
Shannon Brown (singer) (born 1973), American country music artist
Shannon Brown (New Zealand musician), bass player and vocalist for the New Zealand band 48May